Andrew Bolton may refer to:

 Andrew Bolton (curator) (born 1966), British museum curator
 Andrew Bolton (rower) (born 1980), American rower